Highway 1 is a road in Åland that starts in the capital city Mariehamn and ends in Eckerö. The length of the road is 32 kilometers. The road starts at the roundabout near Mariehamn Hospital, which also originates on Highway 2 and Highway 3.

Along the road is Hammarland Church in Hammarland and the Postal Museum in Eckerö.

Route 

The road passes through the following localities:
Mariehamn
Jomala
Hammarland
Eckerö

See also
Transport in Åland
Finnish national road 1

Source

References

Roads in Åland